Caddo County is a county located in the U.S. state of Oklahoma. As of the 2010 census, the population was 29,600. Its county seat is Anadarko. Created in 1901 as part of Oklahoma Territory, the county is named for the Caddo tribe who were settled here on a reservation in the 1870s. Caddo County is immediately west of the seven-county Greater Oklahoma City metro area, and although is not officially in the metro area, it has many economic ties in this region.

History
Caddo County was organized on August 6, 1901, when the Federal Government allotted the Kiowa, Comanche, and Arapaho reservations and sold the surplus land to white settlers. The reservation land was part of Oklahoma Territory until Oklahoma became a state on November 16, 1907. Part of its land was taken at statehood to form neighboring Grady County. Some additional land was taken in 1911 and also awarded to Grady County.

Agriculture has been the mainstay of the local economy since its founding. The main crops were cotton, corn, wheat, alfalfa, broom corn, and kaffir corn. Poultry and livestock production have also been important. By 1960, Caddo County ranked first in Oklahoma for producing of peanuts, hogs and poultry.

The first oil field (Cement Field) in the county was discovered in 1911, and oil production has remained important to the county economy since then. Smaller-scale booms in oil production occurred in the 1960s, 1970s and 1980s.

Geography
The county mostly lies in the Gypsum Hills and the Red Bed plains physiographic areas. The extreme southwestern corner is in the Wichita Mountains. The county is drained by the Washita River, Pond Creek and Sugar Creek. Major reservoirs are Chickasha Lake, Ellsworth Lake, and Fort Cobb Lake, Red Rock Canyon State Park near Hinton is notable for having the only remaining stand of native Caddo maple trees.

Major highways

  Interstate 40
  Interstate 44
  H.E. Bailey Turnpike
  U.S. Highway 62
  U.S. Highway 281
  U.S. Highway 277
  State Highway 8
  State Highway 9
  State Highway 19
  State Highway 58

Adjacent counties
 Blaine County (north)
 Canadian County (northeast)
 Grady County (east)
 Comanche County (south)
 Kiowa County (southwest)
 Washita County (west)
 Custer County (northwest)

Demographics

As of the census of 2000, there were 30,150 people, 10,957 households, and 7,965 families residing in the county.  The population density was 9/km2 (24/sq mi).  There were 13,096 housing units at an average density of 4/km2 (10/sq mi).  The racial makeup of the county was 65.55% White, 2.92% Black or African American, 24.28% Native American, 0.17% Asian, 0.02% Pacific Islander, 2.70% from other races, and 4.36% from two or more races.  6.28% of the population were Hispanic or Latino of any race. 93.8% English, 4.5% Spanish and 1.2% Kiowa as their first language.

There were 10,957 households, out of which 33.30% had children under the age of 18 living with them, 55.20% were married couples living together, 13.00% had a female householder with no husband present, and 27.30% were non-families. 24.80% of all households were made up of individuals, and 12.50% had someone living alone who was 65 years of age or older.  The average household size was 2.62 and the average family size was 3.13.

In the county, the population was spread out, with 28.50% under the age of 18, 8.50% from 18 to 24, 26.00% from 25 to 44, 22.10% from 45 to 64, and 14.90% who were 65 years of age or older.  The median age was 36 years. For every 100 females there were 98.60 males.  For every 100 females age 18 and over, there were 96.00 males.

The median income for a household in the county was $27,347, and the median income for a family was $32,118. Males had a median income of $26,373 versus $18,658 for females. The per capita income for the county was $13,298.  About 16.70% of families and 21.70% of the population were below the poverty line, including 28.00% of those under age 18 and 15.90% of those age 65 or over.

Politics
During the 20th century, Caddo County was a bellwether county: between 1912 and 2004, the county voted for the winner in every election but 1956, 1960 and 1988.  However, while Democrats have a large plurality of registered voters, the county has recently been swept up in the growing Republican trend throughout Oklahoma. John McCain (2008), Mitt Romney (2012) and Donald Trump (2016) each received at least 64% of the county's vote.

Economy
Caddo County is home to cattle ranching and significant wheat and peanut farm operations—with a few of the producers practicing environmentally friendly no-till or reduced tillage farming methods.

There is also one winery and vineyard in the county (Woods and Waters Winery and Vineyard).

Communities

City
 Anadarko (county seat)

Towns

 Apache
 Binger
 Bridgeport
 Carnegie
 Cement
 Cogar
 Cyril
 Eakly
 Fort Cobb
 Gracemont
 Hinton
 Hydro
 Lookeba
 Pine Ridge
 Spring Creek

Unincorporated communities

 Albert
 Alden
 Alfalfa
 Boone
 Broxton
 Cogar
 Nowhere
 Pine Ridge
 Scott
 Sickles
 Spring Creek
 Stecker
 Washita

Education
Public school districts:
 Anadarko Public Schools
 Binger-Oney Public Schools
 Boone-Apache Public Schools
 Carnegie Public Schools
 Cement Public Schools
 Cordell Public Schools
 Cyril Public Schools
 Fletcher Public Schools
 Fort Cobb-Broxton Schools
 Gracemont Public Schools
 Hinton Public Schools
 Hydro-Eakly Public Schools
 Lookeba-Sickles Public Schools
 Minco Public Schools
 Verden Public Schools
 Pioneer Public School (elementary school only)

There is also a Bureau of Indian Education (BIE)-operated school, Riverside Indian School.

NRHP sites

The following sites in Caddo County are listed on the National Register of Historic Places:

 Amphlett Brothers Drug and Jewelry Store, Apache
 Anadarko Armory, Anadarko
 Anadarko Downtown Historic District, Anadarko
 Apache State Bank, Apache
 Bridgeport Bridge, Bridgeport
 Bridgeport Hill-Hydro Route 66 Segment, Hydro
 Caddo County Medicine Creek Archeological District Binger
 First Baptist Church (Colored), Anadarko
 Fort Cobb Site, Fort Cobb
 Provine Service Station, Hydro
 Randlett Park, Anadarko
 Rock Island Passenger Station, Anadarko
 Rock Mary, Hinton
 Stevens Rock Shelter, Gracemont

See also
 Tropical Storm Erin (2007)

References

External links
 Encyclopedia of Oklahoma History and Culture - Caddo County
 Oklahoma Digital Maps: Digital Collections of Oklahoma and Indian Territory

 
Populated places established in 1901
1901 establishments in Oklahoma Territory